The Sanctuary of the Madonna delle Grazie is a Roman Catholic church in Montefiascone, province of Viterbo, Lazio, Italy. It is located near the Basilica church of San Flaviano.

History
The sanctuary was built in the 14th century, with the first documentation in 1333, when the community erected the adjacent hospital. In 1465 the church was affiliated with the Servite order. The church was rebuilt in 1492.

References

Roman Catholic churches in Montefiascone
15th-century Roman Catholic church buildings in Italy
Roman Catholic churches completed in 1492
Renaissance architecture in Lazio